Entrust Bankcard is a payment processing company based in Phoenix, Arizona in the United States. Founded in 2006, Entrust Bankcard was listed at #18 on Inc.'s 2011 "Inc. 500" of the 500 fastest growing companies in America.

2010 revenue for Entrust Bankcard was $9.4 million, an increase of 8,417% over 2007's $110 thousand. Entrust grew from 6 employees to 158 employees during that time.  Since 2008, Entrust Bankcard has gone from serving 800 customers to almost 4,000 by November 2010.

Entrust Bankcard claims to donate 10% of its profits toward Engage Foundation but never followed through. The Engage Foundation is a charity owned by Nathan J. Reis, the Entrust Bankcard CEO. The Engage Foundation is directed towards single mothers and young children as Reis was raised by a single mother in Wisconsin.

On May 20, 2011, the Better Business Bureau revoked the accreditation of Entrust Bankcard, leaving it with a rating of "F".

References

External links 
 Official website

Credit cards in the United States
Financial services companies of the United States
Companies based in Phoenix, Arizona
Financial services companies established in 2006
2006 establishments in Arizona